Night of the Stormrider is the second studio album by the American heavy metal band Iced Earth, released in 1991 through Century Media Records. It is a concept album centered on an idea that was created by the band's leader Jon Schaffer. Night of the Stormrider is the only Iced Earth album to feature lead singer John Greely and drummer Rick Secchiari. The album was re-released in a remixed and remastered version in 2002 by producer Jim Morris.

Concept meaning
The album's concept is about a man who is betrayed by religion and turns away from it in anger. The dark forces of nature reach out to this enraged man and use him as their vessel to bring death and destruction to Earth. He is commanded to travel to a desert, where he is given visions that reveal the truth of humanity, and warp his mind further to make him the "Stormrider". After the destruction of the world, he is then damned forever into the depths of Hell, also referenced as the River Styx. After being forever damned and taunted by evil spirits, he eventually sees what he has done, and realizes that it is too late to repent.

Track listing 
All lyrics and music written by Jon Schaffer, except where noted.

Personnel

Iced Earth
John Greely – vocals
Jon Schaffer – rhythm guitar, backing vocals, lead vocals (on track 2), co-producer
Randall Shawver – lead guitar
Dave Abell – bass
Rick Secchiari – drums

Additional musicians
Roger Huff – keyboards
Kent Smith - keyboards

Other personnel
Tom Morris – producer, engineer
Jim Morris - mixing, mastering (on 2002 remixed & remastered version)
Axel Hermann – artwork
Travis Smith  – artwork (on 2002 remixed & remastered version)
Rick Borstelman – artwork
Frank Albrecht – photography
Dirk Rudolph – layout
Philipp Schulte - product coordination

References

1991 albums
Iced Earth albums
Century Media Records albums
Concept albums
Albums recorded at Morrisound Recording